R. californica  may refer to:
 Rafinesquia californica, the California chicory or California plumeseed, a flowering plant species native to most of the southwestern United States as far north as Oregon and to Baja California in Mexico
 Rhamnus californica, the California buckthorn or coffeeberry, a plant species native to California and southwestern Oregon
 Rhynchospora californica, the California beaked-rush or California beaksedge, a plant species endemic to California
 Rosa californica, the California wild rose, a plant species native to California and Oregon

See also
 List of Latin and Greek words commonly used in systematic names#C